King's Manor Speciality Sports School was a secondary school in Acklam, Middlesbrough, England. It was situated on Hall Drive and is next to Hall Garth Community Arts College; the two schools merged in 2010 to create Oakfields Community College. The new school combines both Performing Arts and Sports specialities. Hall Garth, being the least occupied, moved staff and pupils into the King's Manor buildings, and new school buildings were constructed on the Hall Garth site and opened in 2012. The school was also close to St David's School and Acklam Grange School.

Before closure, the school was in National Challenge as it consistently struggled to achieve more than 30% of students gaining 5 A to C grades at GCSE. Its neighbouring school, Hall Garth, was in the same situation.

The school funded the building of a school in Cameroon.

Subjects taught
The school taught a range of subjects and as a Specialist sports colleges it was particularly known for the quality of its facilities for Physical Education.

Houses
As a Specialist Sports College, the school was involved in a project called the Aspiring Sports College Project (ASCOP) and eventually became a national demonstration site. The project aimed to raise student aspirations through listening to their views and ideas and giving them a sense of belonging to the school. It was this work which led to the House system launch in 2005; the school was divided into houses named after the ships of the local hero Captain James Cook:

Resolution: "Aim to be the best"                                     
Endeavour: "Endeavour to Succeed"
Adventure: "Have a great deal of fun"     
Discovery: "Discover your potential"

In line with a general trend for schools to listen more to the views of students, the concept of "student voice" at King's Manor was used to allow students to help review the way that houses and subjects operated and how teaching and learning was delivered.

References

External links
 School website

Defunct schools in Middlesbrough
Educational institutions disestablished in 2010
2010 disestablishments in England